Oncolabis is a monotypic snout moth genus described by Philipp Christoph Zeller in 1848. Its only species, Oncolabis anticella, described in the same article, is known from Brazil.

References

Moths described in 1848
Phycitinae
Monotypic moth genera
Moths of South America